Tázlár is a  village and municipality in Bács-Kiskun county, in the Southern Great Plain region of southern Hungary. It is about 10 km away from its closest neighbor, Soltvadkert.

Geography

History
Tázlár's name was changed to Prónayfalva in 1907, but since 1947 it's called Tázlár again.
The village was studied in the 1970s by anthropologist Chris Hann, resulting in a book "Tázlár: A village in Hungary". He has returned there in 2000s studying the further developments The New Property System in Tázlár

Demographics

Ethnicity
As of the census of 2001 there were 2,014 people living in Tázlár. The ethnical background of the town was 95.1% Hungarian, 0.7% Gypsy, 0.2% Slovak, 4.5% other.

Religion
The religious affiliations of the people of Tázlár are:

 Roman Catholic - 65.9%
 Presbyterian - 16.1%
 Lutheran - 6.5%
 Other Christian - 0.9%
 Non-Religious - 10.5%

Populated places in Bács-Kiskun County